Woodchoppertown is an unincorporated community located in Earl Township, Berks County, Pennsylvania, United States. It is located 13.7 miles from Reading and 11.9 miles from Pottstown.

Unincorporated communities in Berks County, Pennsylvania
Unincorporated communities in Pennsylvania